The Canadian Snowboard Federation (also known as "Canada Snowboard") is the governing body in Canada for the sport of snowboarding.  It is a member discipline of the Canadian Snowsports Association, and is recognized by the Government of Canada, the Fédération Internationale de Ski, the World Snowboard Federation, the Canadian Olympic Committee, and the Canadian Paralympic Committee. They are a federally incorporated non-profit organization. Canada~Snowboard is governed by a board of directors elected by and from its volunteer membership and manages programs nationally and locally through professional staff, provincial and territorial snowboard associations, and their affiliated clubs.

Provincial associations
AB - Alberta Snowboarding
BC - British Columbia Snowboard Association
MB — Snowboard Association of Manitoba
NB — New Brunswick Snowboard Association
NL — Newfoundland Labrador Snowboard Association
NS - Snowboard Nova Scotia
NWT — Northwest Territories Snowboard Association
ON - Snowboard Ontario
PE — Prince Edward Island Snowboard Association
QC - Snowboard Quebec
SK - Saskatchewan Snowboard Association
YK - Snowboard Yukon

See also
 Alpine Canada, alpine skiing federation
 Canadian Freestyle Ski Association, freestyle skiing federation
 Nordic Combined Ski Canada, Canadian Nordic combined skiing sports federation
 Ski Jumping Canada, Canadian ski jumping sports federation
 Cross Country Canada, Canadian cross country skiing sports federation
 Biathlon Canada, Canadian biathlon ski-shooting sports federation

References

External links
Canada~Snowboard

Snowboard
Snowboarding